Ammammagarillu is a 2018 Telugu comedy drama film directed by Sundar Surya. The film stars Naga Shaurya and Shamili with Sumithra as the grandmother (ammamma).

Plot 
20 years ago the family of Ravi Babu (Rao Ramesh) and his brother in law (Suman) split. Santosh (Naga Shaurya), the son of Suman who loves his Ammamma Seetha Maha Lakshmi (Sumithra) very much, makes it his personal mission to bring the family closer in 20 days.  At the same time, Seetha Maha Lakshmi decides to distribute her property, and invites all the family members to her village.

Cast

Production 
The film was shot at Ramoji Film City.

Soundtrack

Release 
The Times of India gave the film two and a half stars out of five and wrote: "Go watch this one this weekend if you cherished the memories you made at ammamma’s home during the summers. But if real life holds enough family politics for you, give this one a cold hard miss". The Hindu noted that "With lazy acting by everybody and poor story development, there is no high point in the film and not a single scene that makes for a compelling watch".

In 2019, the film was dubbed into Hindi as Naani Maa. The Hindi version saw a positive response as the film reached 11 million views in two days and was ranked number two on trending.

See also  
 Sathamanam Bhavati
 Prati Roju Pandage

References

External links 

2018 films
2010s Telugu-language films
Indian family films
Indian buddy films
Indian drama films
2018 drama films
Indian comedy-drama films
Indian coming-of-age films
Films shot in Telangana
Films set in Andhra Pradesh
Films set in Telangana
Films set in universities and colleges
Remakes of Indian films
2018 directorial debut films